Forbidden Island is a 1999 American TV series.

It was filmed in New Zealand. It was described as Lord of the Flies meets The X Files.

Plot
Strangers have crashed on an island with supernatural powers.

References

External links
Forbidden Island at BFI
Forbidden Island at IMDb

1999 American television series debuts